Fuiono Tenina Crichton (born 1951) is a Samoan politician and Member of the Legislative Assembly of Samoa. He is a member of the FAST Party.

Fuiono first ran for election in the 2021 Samoan general election. After being defeated by Leota Tima Leavai he challenged her election in an election petition, forcing her resignation. He stood again in the subsequent by-election, where he was declared elected unopposed after successfully challenging his only opponent's eligibility to stand.

References

Living people
1951 births
Members of the Legislative Assembly of Samoa
Faʻatuatua i le Atua Samoa ua Tasi politicians
People from Savai'i